Karen Page is a fictional character appearing in American comic books published by Marvel Comics. She serves as the original love interest for Daredevil, under Matt Murdock's employ as his legal secretary. In 1999, Page was killed by Bullseye, and since the 1980s her role as primary love interest has been superseded by Elektra Natchios.

Karen Page was portrayed by Ellen Pompeo in the 2003 feature film Daredevil, and by Deborah Ann Woll in the Marvel Television streaming television productions Daredevil, The Defenders, and The Punisher, set in the Marvel Cinematic Universe (MCU).

Publication history
Created by writer Stan Lee and artist Bill Everett, she first appeared in Daredevil #1 (April 1964).

Character overview
In her first appearances, Karen is the beautiful secretary for the law firm of Daredevil's alter ego Matt Murdock, and the mutual love interest of both Murdock and his partner Foggy Nelson. Her relationship with Murdock hits a downward spiral when he reveals his secret identity to her in Daredevil #57 (October 1969), setting off a long break-up which concluded with her departure from the series in issue #86 (April 1972). Within these final stories, she trades her profession of secretary to become a film actress.

After three years absence from published stories, Karen returned for a considerable stint as a supporting character in Ghost Rider, starting with vol. 2 #13 (August 1975) and continuing through to #26 (October 1977). During this time, a crossover with Daredevil #138 afforded her a brief return appearance in the series where she got her start. A 1978 appearance in Marvel Two-in-One would prove the character's last showing for over seven years.

Karen returned in Born Again, the award-winning storyline beginning in Daredevil #227 (February 1986) that would ultimately restore her earlier role as Daredevil's love interest. Writer Ann Nocenti gave considerably more development to their relationship, and even had Karen acting as a sidekick to Daredevil for the first time in issue #259, in which she goes undercover to help take down a child pornography ring. She was again dropped from the series in issue #263 (February 1989) for another long-term breakup from Murdock, but this time was brought back just two years later, for Daredevil #294 (July 1991).

Karen is killed by Daredevil's adversary Bullseye in Daredevil vol. 2 #5, (March 10, 1999).

Fictional character biography
Karen Page is hired to be the secretary by Foggy Nelson for the new law firm Nelson and Murdock. She is infatuated with Matt Murdock from the moment they meet. When Matt introduces her to the adventuring, wisecracking aspect of his personality, in the guise of his "twin brother" Mike, she finds herself equally charmed by this side of Murdock.

Dr. Paxton Page (Karen's father) fakes his own kidnapping and death in order to assume the guise of the villain Death's Head. Karen returns to her parents' home in Fagan Corners, Vermont, to investigate her father's disappearance. Daredevil follows her. In the ensuing battle between Daredevil and Death's Head, Death's Head spills a vat of molten cobalt over Daredevil, but realizes that Karen is endangered. This brings Paxton back to his own senses, pushing Daredevil and Karen to safety. He appears to die in this act of self-sacrifice, when he is coated in the molten cobalt. After the battle with Death's Head, Daredevil's true identity is revealed to Karen. She constantly fears for Matt's safety, but Daredevil cannot give up fighting crime. Karen eventually leaves Matt and moves to California to pursue an acting career. She finds work as an actress in a daytime soap opera.

Karen appears alongside Johnny Blaze in a film. After a scene is interrupted by The Uncanny Orb, Katy Milner (Karen's stuntwoman) confides in Johnny about Karen's history of "unhappy romances" including the ones with Murdock and Phil Hickock. Later on, Karen herself falls under the Orb's control.

Karen is offered a role on The Incredible Hulk TV show which was on its first season at the time. She is kidnapped by three ex-stuntmen on the show, but is saved by the Thing (who is looking for his own TV show), and the Hulk (who is annoyed at having this show).

Karen becomes addicted to heroin and starts making pornographic movies. In need of a fix, she sells Daredevil's secret identity to a drug dealer who in turn sells this to the Kingpin. Karen is forced to return to New York, where she meets up again with Matt. Matt helps Karen beat her addiction, and they resume their relationship and begin sharing an apartment.

Realizing that Matt is incomplete without work as a lawyer, Karen founds a free drug and legal clinic, where she counsels drug addicts and Matt provides legal advice and "ghost lawyering". The clinic is destroyed during a demonic invasion of Manhattan, and Karen discovers hours later that Matt has been having an affair with Typhoid Mary. These combined blows leave her psychologically lost, and she runs away.

She becomes an anti-pornography activist, assists Daredevil and the Black Widow in fighting crime on separate occasions, and reluctantly begins dating Matt. At this point, she becomes a radio show host under the name "Paige Angel". She eventually realizes that she is too dependent on Matt and that her past is a constant barrier between them. Karen leaves Matt to accept a talk show host position in Los Angeles.

While in California, Karen has a routine blood test as part of an insurance policy application. The supervillain Mysterio, as part of a plan to psychologically destroy Daredevil for one last scheme, disguises himself as a doctor, performs the blood test, and tells her that she is HIV positive. Devastated, Karen returns to New York and tells Matt about the diagnosis. Using another disguise, Mysterio suggests to Karen that her infection is due to an infant that Matt is currently protecting, as the child is 'really' the Antichrist, but Matt forces her to acknowledge that she is just trying to avoid facing her own responsibility for her state. Later, during a fight between Daredevil and Bullseye, Karen is murdered by Bullseye when she moves to intercept a billy-club thrown at Daredevil's head and is impaled in the heart.

Devastated by Karen's death, Matt briefly contemplates suicide but is given new strength to keep going by remembering some of their times together, such as when she convinced Matt to take a night off on his birthday and when she said that she didn't want Daredevil to quit as she always felt safer knowing the vigilante was out there. After Mysterio's role in the scheme is revealed and the villain commits suicide, Matt attempts and fails to give Karen's eulogy, finding himself overwhelmed at the memory of her loss. Initially bitter at Karen dying simply so that Mysterio could feel better about himself, a later conversation with Spider-Man helps Daredevil realize that the infant he's saved represents something positive that has come of the whole affair. The baby is given up for adoption to a couple in New Jersey. Before leaving, Matt names the baby after Karen and hopes that her new parents will allow the occasional visit from her "Uncle Matt".

Other versions

"What If Karen Page Had Lived?"
In the What If comic "What If Karen Page Had Lived?", Karen is narrowly saved from death when Bullseye hits her in the shoulder rather than the head. However, driven by his rage at the fear of losing her rather than his focused grief when he actually lost her, Matt beats the Kingpin to death for his part in Mysterio's scheme, and is subsequently arrested. When Matt is sentenced to 44 years in the Raft for the crime, Karen leaves town and disappears. Matt assumes that she had become severely depressed and may have killed herself. He never sees her again. However, in the beginning of the comic book, it is revealed  that the entire story is the speculation of the main Marvel Universe version of Brian Michael Bendis, the writer himself, who makes a cameo as narrator.

Secret Wars: Secret Lovers
In a one-off book of the Secret Wars storyline called Secret Wars: Secret Lovers, a universe that became the Battleworld domain of Limbo is shown where Matt and Karen have grown close to the point of living with each other. Daredevil finds himself in a battle with Typhoid Mary after having nightmares about her prior that Karen is aware of. Karen follows the two only to discover that Mary is actually Mephisto, who wants to spend the final evening before Inferno psychologically and physically torturing Matt. Karen saves Matt by cutting off Mephisto's head with Mary's sword and the two embrace one last time as the world burns around them.

In other media

Film
Karen appears in the 2003 feature film Daredevil, portrayed by Ellen Pompeo. Most of her scenes were deleted from the final theatrical cut, but they can be seen in the Director's Cut. In the film, she is attracted to Matt, as shown when she presents two invitations to a business party and demonstrates disappointment when Foggy promptly takes the second invitation. When Matt is tracking the Kingpin's forces, Karen helps Foggy determine the meaning of a key piece of evidence in a case.

Television

In the Marvel Cinematic Universe's Netflix shows, Karen Page is portrayed by Deborah Ann Woll.

Background
Born in Fagan Corners, Vermont, Karen works as a waitress at Penny's Place, a diner run by her mother Penelope and father Paxton, with her brother Kevin running the kitchen. After Penelope dies from cancer, Karen is left to run the diner with her father and brother. To cope with the stress and the fear that her father will drive the diner into bankruptcy without her around to do bookkeeping, she turns to drugs and hooks up with a dealer named Todd Neiman. One night, after a heated argument over dinner, Kevin stages an intervention by burning down Todd's trailer. An enraged Todd attacks him with a tire iron, and Karen is forced to shoot him with the gun in his truck to keep him from killing Kevin. While driving away, Karen gets into an argument with Kevin, during which she drifts off the road and crashes into a guardrail. The car rolls over several times before coming to rest on its roof, injuring Karen and killing Kevin. The local sheriff, Bernie Cohen, takes sympathy on the Page family and falsifies the accident report to say that Kevin was alone in the car, so that Karen does not face prison time.  Karen leaves town after being disowned by her father, and bounces around before arriving in New York City and landing a job as a secretary at Union Allied Construction, a construction company rebuilding Midtown Manhattan after the alien invasion of 2012.

Daredevil season 1
In the first season of Daredevil, Karen discovers evidence that Union Allied's pension fund is being used by Wilson Fisk to launder criminal money. In response, Fisk has her framed for fatally stabbing a coworker, Daniel Fisher, in her apartment, and intends to have a lawyer on his payroll approach Karen to extort her into giving up her copy of the pension file. However, Matt and Foggy show up and agree to take Karen on as a client thanks to a tipoff from Brett Mahoney. As a result, Fisk instead settles for trying to kill Karen, first by having James Wesley intimidate a guard into trying to hang Karen in her jail cell, an attempt that fails when Karen fights back, drawing blood from one of the guard's eyes. Undeterred, he makes a second attempt by sending an assassin to Karen's apartment to attack her when she sneaks out of Matt's apartment to retrieve the pension file, but Matt saves her and delivers the pension file to the New York Bulletin so that Union Allied's criminal dealings are publicly exposed.  Feeling indebted to Matt and Foggy for getting her out of jail, Karen offers to work for them as Nelson & Murdock's secretary.

While Fisk orders the deaths of everyone involved in the scheme and the attempts to kill Karen, he settles for buying Karen's silence by coercing her into signing a nondisclosure agreement with six months' salary attached to it. While she reluctantly signs the agreement, she is angered that the people who tried to have her killed have not been brought to justice, so she approaches Ben Urich, the New York Bulletin reporter who broke the Union Allied story, and works with him to follow the money trail. She refuses to back down even after Ben makes clear that her prior activities in Vermont will be used against her to discredit her as a source. Eventually, she finds out that Union Allied has ties to Westmeyer Holt, a development company that Fisk is using to strongarm tenants into vacating tenements in Hell's Kitchen that he intends to develop into high-rise condominiums. One of these tenants, Elena Cardenas, is a client of Nelson & Murdock's. On one occasion, two Westmeyer contractors attack Karen while she is paying a visit to Elena, though she is saved when Foggy turns up and beats the men unconscious with his softball bat.

After Fisk makes himself a public figure at Vanessa's urging, Karen begins digging into his life looking for incriminating evidence against him. She finds out that his mother Marlene Vistain is in fact alive and well, and living in a nursing home in upstate New York. Accompanied by Ben, she talks to Marlene and learns about how when Fisk was 12, he beat his abusive father to death with a hammer. Marlene informs Wesley of this visit, prompting Wesley to abduct Karen as she is returning to her apartment. He takes her to a warehouse, and tries to intimidate her into backing down by threatening to have her friends and loved ones killed. However, he makes the mistake of leaving a loaded gun (which he procured from the head of Fisk's security detail) within arm's reach of Karen. When Wesley is distracted by his phone picking up an incoming call from Fisk, Karen grabs the gun and shoots him to death. She is deeply traumatized over taking a life, having nightmares in which Fisk appears in her living room and strangles her to death with his bare hands. She is further wracked with guilt when Fisk personally murders Ben after finding out from a mole at the Bulletin about his and Karen's visit to Marlene. Nonetheless, Karen composes herself and helps Matt and Foggy track down the hiding place of Carl Hoffman, one of the corrupt detectives who investigated her for Fisher's murder and who in the interim has been coerced by Fisk into killing his own partner, allowing Matt to bring him in and have him give up Fisk.

Daredevil season 2
In season 2 of Daredevil, Karen comes into contact with and befriends Frank Castle when the firm takes Castle as a client after being charged with multiple murders of different low-level criminals and she helps defend him in court. She and Matt also briefly date before Matt's double-life as Daredevil causes a falter in contributing to Frank's trial and Karen finds Elektra Natchios in Matt's bed when she tells Matt about it.  When Nelson and Murdock falls apart, Karen joins the  New York Bulletin with the intention of writing Castle's true story, however during her investigation, she is almost killed by Colonel Schoonover, only being saved by Castle's intervention. In the second-season finale, Karen and several others that Daredevil has saved are kidnapped by the Hand as bait for Matt, who is able to track them down and rescue them after Karen convinces Turk Barrett to turn on his ankle bracelet.

The Defenders
By the start of The Defenders, Matt and Karen are back on speaking terms, although it is clear Karen is hesitant to resume a relationship due to her own secrets. Later, when Matt believes the Hand are targeting his loved ones, he visits Karen at her office to take her to the 29th precinct. Karen is angered when she finds out he has resumed Daredevil activities, but agrees to hide with Foggy in the 29th precinct until the Hand have been taken down. While there, she bonds with Trish Walker over their complicated relationships with Matt and Jessica Jones. When Matt is presumed killed in the destruction of Midland Circle, Karen refuses to believe Matt has died and holds out hope that he somehow survived the collapse.

The Punisher season 1
In the first season of The Punisher, Karen is a recurring character. Caught up in her grief over losing Matt, she agrees to help Frank when he approaches her for help identifying Micro, the hacker who has been shadowing him and knows about his past activities in Kandahar. When Lewis Wilson (Daniel Webber) goes on a bombing spree, he delivers a manifesto to the Bulletin explicitly citing Karen's defense of Frank in her coverage. Incensed, Karen talks down to Lewis when she appears on a radio show to debate Senator Stan Ori. This prompts Lewis to try and attack Karen in a hotel, though he is driven off by Frank, who later goads him into killing himself in a meat locker in the hotel's kitchen.

Daredevil season 3
At the start of season 3, Karen is still refusing to believe that Matt is dead. To that end, she is hyperfixating on the Midland Circle collapse to a degree that Ellison begins to take notice, and is paying rent on Matt's apartment. Ellison and his wife also try to set Karen up for a date with his nephew Jason, with minimal success. Her belief that Matt is still alive is piqued when Ellison sends her to interview Neda Kazemi, a socialite whose father was assaulted on Fisk's orders to keep him from repurchasing a hotel he sold to one of Fisk's shell companies, and learns that Matt fought off the assailants.

Upon Fisk's release from prison, Ellison tries to sideline Karen, seeing as her past involvement with Fisk gives her a conflict of interest. Against Ellison's wishes, Karen manages to determine Fisk secretly owns the hotel he's being kept under house arrest in, but is threatened by Fisk's fixer Felix Manning when she tries to get him on record regarding Fisk's money laundering. When Fisk frames Matt as a scapegoat for Ray Nadeem, Karen reluctantly helps Matt bring in Jasper Evans, a lifer Fisk hired to stab him as part of his plan to get out of prison. Learning of this from a mole in the FBI, Fisk realizes Evans is a liability that needs to be eliminated, and sends Benjamin "Dex" Poindexter to the Bulletin dressed in a fake Daredevil costume. Despite Matt's efforts to fight him off, Dex kills several of Karen's coworkers, as well as wounds Matt, Foggy and Ellison, before shooting Evans dead with Karen's gun.

Karen later loses her job at the Bulletin when she refuses to give Matt's identity over to Ellison. Incensed, Karen decides to visit Fisk at his penthouse and try to provoke him into attacking her in front of the FBI by revealing the truth about Wesley. Fisk attempts to murder her on the spot, but is stopped by Foggy's timely intervention. Undeterred, Fisk orders a hit on Karen, hiring Dex to attack her in Matt's church. Matt thwarts the attempt, but Father Lantom is killed taking a baton meant for Karen. Matt and Karen are only able to escape the church with assistance from Foggy and Nadeem, who they persuade to testify in front of a grand jury. After Nadeem is subsequently killed by Dex at his house on Vanessa's orders, his wife passes on a video confession he made hours before his death over to Foggy, which Karen works with Ellison to publish on the Internet so as to publicize evidence of Fisk's latest crimes.

The Punisher season 2
Karen's last appearance is in the second season of The Punisher, where she shows up to help Frank escape the hospital after Pilgrim puts a bounty out on him.

Other appearances
Karen is mentioned on several occasions in other shows, but does not appear onscreen.
Karen is mentioned three times in the first season of Iron Fist.
 In the second season of Luke Cage, a story Karen runs about Mariah Dillard's massacre of a restaurant owned by Bushmaster's aunt and uncle leads to Mariah learning that Bushmaster's aunt survived the shooting.
Karen is mentioned in a newspaper article about Luke Cage in the second season of Cloak & Dagger.

References

Characters created by Bill Everett
Characters created by Stan Lee
Comics characters introduced in 1964
Daredevil (Marvel Comics) characters
Fictional actors
Fictional heroin users
Fictional pornographic film actors
Fictional prostitutes
Fictional secretaries
Fictional radio personalities
Fictional female sex workers
Marvel Comics female characters